Moris  is one of the 67 municipalities of Chihuahua, in north-western Mexico. The municipal seat lies at Moris. The municipality covers an area of 2,219.7 km².

As of 2010, the municipality had a total population of 5,312, up from 5,144 as of 2005. 

As of 2010, the town of Moris had a population of 1,799. Other than the town of Moris, the municipality had 183 localities, none of which had a population over 1,000.

Geography

Towns and villages
The municipality has 119 localities. The largest are:

References

Municipalities of Chihuahua (state)